Mangifera parvifolia is a species of plant in the family Anacardiaceae. It is a tree found in Indonesia, Malaysia, and Singapore.

References

parvifolia
Trees of Malesia
Least concern plants
Taxonomy articles created by Polbot
Taxa named by Anna Koorders-Schumacher
Taxa named by Jacob Gijsbert Boerlage